General Hugo Banzer Suárez took the Presidency of Bolivia on 21 August 1971 and formed his cabinet.

(*) 03.10.1972 – 14.02.1974 Agriculture

mil – military

ind – independent

FSB – Bolivian Socialist Falange

MNR – Revolutionary Nationalist Movement

FRB – Barrientista Revolutionary Force

Notes

Cabinets of Bolivia
Cabinets established in 1971
Cabinets disestablished in 1978
1971 establishments in Bolivia